Theretra natashae is a moth of the  family Sphingidae. It is found in Indonesia.

It is most similar to Theretra incarnata but distinguishable by the white outer margins to the tegulae, the much larger discal spot on the forewing upperside and the pair of black basal patches on the upperside of the abdomen. Furthermore, it is distinguishable from Theretra clotho clotho and Theretra indistincta indistincta by the much larger discal spot on the forewing upperside, the stronger oblique postmedian line and by the dark patch between this line and the tornus on the inner margin of the forewing upperside.

Subspecies
Theretra natashae natashae
Theretra natashae paukstadtorum Eitschberger, 2000 (Lombok)

References

Theretra
Moths described in 1995